Ronald E. Schindle is a Canadian curler.

Teams

References

External links
 
 Ron Schindle – Curling Canada Stats Archive

Living people
Canadian male curlers
Curlers from Alberta
Brier champions
Sportspeople from Medicine Hat
Year of birth missing (living people)